is a Japanese manga artist. His simple drawing style reflects the gentle nature of his often romantic tales of modern young Japanese salary-men.

Works

Manga
1986-1989, Tokuma Shoten, 4 volumes, originally published in Petit Apple Pie anthology
About a girl who "sweats" nitroglycerin, and therefore must constantly be eating and drinking things to cool her down.
1986-1987, Tokuma Shoten, 1 volume
1989, Tokuma Shotem, 1 volume
1991, Tokuma Shoten, 1 volume
1991, Shogakukan, 2 volumes
A couple is drawn together despite mutual dislike.
Living Game1991-1993, Shogakukan, 10 volumes
A salaryman's apartment is turned into temporary office following a disaster at the new office.
1992-1993, Shogakukan, collected in volume 5 of Let's Get Married
1994-1995, Shogakukan, 6 volumes
A reception center staffed by marryable people.
1996-1997, Shogakukan, 5 volumes
1998-2000, Shogakukan, 5 volumes
2000-2003, Shogakukan, 6 volumes
2002, Shogakukan, 2 volumes
2003-2004, Shogakukan, 4 volumes
2004-2005, Shogakukan, 2 volumes
2008-suspended, Shogakukan, 2 volumes (to date)
2009, Koike Shoin, included in Night Sneaker volume
2009-2010, Shueisha, 1 volume
2010, Asahi Shimbun Publications
2010-2012, Houbunsha, 1 volume (to date)
2010-ongoing, Tokuma Shoten, 2 volumes (to date)

Manga essay
(2000, Mainichi Communications, 1 volume)

Illustration
(1987-08-01, JICC Shuppankyoku, 1 volume)

Sources:

References

1961 births
Living people
Manga artists from Fukuoka Prefecture
People from Kitakyushu